Medicinal Purposes is a Big Finish Productions audio drama based on the long-running British science fiction television series Doctor Who.

Plot
Edinburgh, 1827. Body snatchers William Burke and William Hare are on the loose while the Sixth Doctor and Evelyn take an interest in the work of Dr Robert Knox.

Cast
The Doctor – Colin Baker
Evelyn Smythe – Maggie Stables
Doctor Robert Knox – Leslie Phillips
Daft Jamie – David Tennant
Mary Patterson – Glenna Morrison
William Burke – Kevin O'Leary
Billy Hare – Tom Farrelly
Old Woman – Janie Booth

Continuity
Knox meets the Doctor and Evelyn again in Assassin in the Limelight.

Notes
This is one of the last stories, and the last Doctor Who story, that David Tennant would record for Big Finish before being cast as the Tenth Doctor.  After leaving the TV series, Tennant was cast as William Burke in the film Burke and Hare, based on the historical murders, but left the film before it began production.

References

External links
Big Finish Productions – Medicinal Purposes

2004 audio plays
Sixth Doctor audio plays
Fiction set in 1827